Essex Junction station, also known as Essex Junction–Burlington, is an Amtrak train station in the city of Essex Junction, Vermont, United States. The station was originally built by the Central Vermont Railway in 1959. It serves Amtrak's Vermonter train, which runs from St. Albans, near the Canada–U.S. border, south to Washington, D.C. Prior to bridge trouble at Alburg, north of St. Albans, train service continued to Montreal. Until the early 1960s, the Boston and Maine railroad operated Montreal to Boston service on The Ambassador through the station.

It became the closest station to Burlington, Vermont's most populous city, when the Rutland Railroad ended service on June 26, 1953. Intercity city service  directly to Burlington Union Station did not resume until July 29, 2022, when the Ethan Allen Express was extended to Burlington.

The Essex Junction station has received negative attention in recent years, with city officials saying it can make visitors "feel scared or intimidated". Local officials have authorized a $3.5 million face-lift of the station, backed by federal funds, which would prepare the station to accommodate larger passenger numbers if the proposed Vermonter extension to Montreal is built.

References

Further reading

External links

Amtrak stations in Vermont
Essex Junction, Vermont
Former Central Vermont Railway stations
Transportation buildings and structures in Chittenden County, Vermont
Buildings and structures in Essex, Vermont